Robert McCue Davis (May 21, 1927 – March 13, 2021) was an American college basketball coach. He was head coach of the High Point Panthers men's basketball team from 1950 to 1953, the Georgetown Tigers men's basketball team from 1953 to 1973, and the Auburn Tigers men's basketball team from 1973 to 1978. In 1975, he was named Southeastern Conference Coach of the Year. From 1964 to 1973, he served as vice chairman for the USA Basketball Committee and was also head coach of the US basketball team in the 1970 Universiade.

Born in Buckingham County, Virginia, Davis moved with his family at age nine to Huntington, West Virginia, where he later graduated from Vinson High School. Upon graduation, he enlisted in the US Navy. He was honorably discharged the next year before enrolling at Georgetown College, where he played football and ran track. He graduated Georgetown in 1950, completed his master’s degree at the University of Kentucky in 1955 and his PhD in education from Peabody College in 1963.

Davis died on March 13, 2021, in his hometown of Georgetown at the age of 93.

References

External links
 Robert McCue Davis obituary
 Georgetown College All-Time Coaches Records

1927 births
2021 deaths
Auburn Tigers men's basketball coaches
Georgetown Tigers football players
Georgetown Tigers men's basketball coaches
High Point Panthers men's basketball coaches
Peabody College alumni
People from Buckingham County, Virginia
Sportspeople from Huntington, West Virginia
University of Kentucky alumni
United States Navy personnel of World War II